The following is a list of players, both past and current, who appeared at least in one game for the Washington Nationals National League franchise (2005–present), also known previously as the Montreal Expos (1969–2004).

Players in Bold are members of the National Baseball Hall of Fame.

Players in Italics have had their numbers retired by the team.


A

 Fernando Abad
 Winston Abreu
 Austin Adams
 Matt Adams
 Jonathan Albaladejo
 Matt Albers
 Santo Alcalá
 Scott Aldred
 Mike Aldrete
 Bernie Allen
 Bill Almon
 Héctor Almonte
 Felipe Alou
 Moisés Alou
 Tavo Alvarez
 Marlon Anderson
 Scott Anderson
 Shane Andrews
 Rick Ankiel
 Luis Aquino
 Tony Armas Jr.
 Pedro Astacio
 Luis Atilano
 Bill Atkinson
 Derek Aucoin
 Bobby Ayala
 Luis Ayala

B

 Mike Bacsik
 Carlos Baerga
 Stan Bahnsen
 Bob Bailey
 Collin Balester
 Bret Barberie
 Josh Bard
 Kyle Barraclough
 Greg Bargar
 Brian Barnes
 Skeeter Barnes
 Tres Barrera
 Aaron Barrett
 Michael Barrett
 Tim Barrett
 Tony Barron
 Randy Bass
 John Bateman
 Miguel Batista
 Tony Batista
 Rafael Bautista
 Joe Beimel
 Matt Belisle
 Juan Bell
 Ronnie Belliard
 Rigo Beltrán
 Francis Beltrán
 Freddie Benavides
 Yamil Benítez
 Gary Bennett
 Shayne Bennett
 Chad Bentz
 Peter Bergeron
 Jason Bergmann
 Roger Bernadina
 Tony Bernazard
 Sean Berry
 Rocky Biddle
 Larry Biittner
 Dann Bilardello
 Joe Bisenius
 Brian Bixler
 Tim Blackwell
 Dennis Blair
 Tony Blanco
 Matt Blank
 Michael Blazek
 Jerry Blevins
 Geoff Blum
 John Boccabella
 Frank Bolick
 Emilio Bonifacio
 Chris Booker
 Aaron Boone
 Don Bosch
 Shawn Boskie
 Kent Bottenfield
 Denis Boucher
 James Bourque
 Micah Bowie
 Oil Can Boyd
 Milton Bradley
 Ron Brand
 Bill Bray
 Hal Breeden
 Fred Breining
 Dan Briggs
 Jim Britton
 Brian Broderick
 Hubie Brooks
 Jim Brower
 Jackie Brown
 Corey Brown
 Curt Brown
 Curtis Brown
 Brian Bruney
 Jim Bullinger
 Kirk Bullinger
 Eric Bullock
 Jamie Burke
 Tim Burke
 Sean Burnett
 Ray Burris
 Sal Butera
 Marlon Byrd

C

 Asdrúbal Cabrera
 Daniel Cabrera
 Orlando Cabrera
 Iván Calderón
 Ron Calloway
 Bill Campbell
 Brett Campbell
 Casey Candaele
 John Candelaria
 Matt Capps
 Héctor Carrasco
 Don Carrithers
 Brett Carroll
 Jamey Carroll
Gary Carter
 Dave Cash
 Craig Caskey
 Vinny Castilla
 Kory Casto
 Bernie Castro
 Xavier Cedeño
 Matt Cepicky
 Rick Cerone
 Endy Chávez
 Raúl Chávez
 Bruce Chen
 Matt Chico
 Ryan Church
 Archi Cianfrocco
 Alex Cintrón
 Royce Clayton
 Donn Clendenon
 Ty Cline
 Tyler Clippard
 Todd Coffey
 Rich Coggins
 Nate Colbert
 Greg Colbrunn
 A. J. Cole
 Lou Collier
 Kevin Collins
 Tim Collins
 Tony Collins
 Jesús Colomé
 Bartolo Colón
 Trace Coquillette
 Alex Cora
 Patrick Corbin
 Roy Corcoran
 Chad Cordero
 Jimmy Cordero
 Wil Cordero
 Rhéal Cormier
 Reid Cornelius
 John Costello
 Darron Cox
 Jim Cox
 Warren Cromartie
 Terry Crowley
 Deivi Cruz
 Darwin Cubillán

D

 John D'Acquisto
 Omar Daal
 Vic Darensbourg
 Ron Darling
 Jack Daugherty
 Erik Davis
 J. J. Davis
 Willie Davis
Andre Dawson
 Boots Day
 Zach Day
 Rick DeHart
 David DeJesus
 Tomás de la Rosa
 José DeLeón
 Don Demola
 Mark DeRosa
 Delino DeShields
 Ian Desmond
 Ross Detwiler
 Einar Díaz
 Wilmer Difo
 Bill Dillman
 Miguel Diloné
 Tom Dixon
 Sean Doolittle
 John Dopson
 Melvin Dorta
 Scott Downs
 Brian Dozier
 Ryan Drese
 Stephen Drew
 Tim Drew
 Dan Driessen
 Rob Ducey
 Hal Dues
 Zach Duke
 Elijah Dukes
 Adam Dunn
 Steve Dunning
 Jim Dwyer
 Mike Dyer
 Duffy Dyer

E

 Adam Eaton
 Joey Eischen
 Roenis Elías
 Dave Engle
 Rick Engle
 Jesse English
 Terry Enyart
 Alex Escobar
 Yunel Escobar
 Danny Espinosa
 Johnny Estrada
 Marco Estrada
 Carl Everett
 Bryan Eversgerd

F

 Roy Face
 Jim Fairey
 Ron Fairly
 Steve Falteisek
 Howard Farmer
 Jeff Fassero
 Erick Fedde
 José Fernández
 Anthony Ferrari
 Robert Fick
 Jeremy Fikac
 Jeff Fischer
 Mike Fitzgerald
 Darrin Fletcher
 Jesús Flores
 Cliff Floyd
 Doug Flynn
 Tom Foley
 Tim Foli
 Chad Fonville
 Barry Foote
 Scott Forster
 Andy Fox
 Terry Francona
 Kevin Frandsen
 Willie Fraser
 Lou Frazier
 Roger Freed
 Steve Frey
 Pepe Frías
 Doug Frobel
 Jerry Fry
 Woodie Fryman
 Mike Fuentes
 Brad Fullmer

G

 Andrés Galarraga
 Víctor Gárate
 Christian Garcia
 Dámaso García
 Mike Gardiner
 Jeff Gardner
 Mark Gardner
 Mike Garman
 Wayne Garrett
 Mike Gates
 Chad Gaudin
 Bob Gebhard
 Brett Gideon
 Joe Gilbert
 Lucas Giolito
 Koda Glover
 Ed Glynn
 Tyrell Godwin
 Jerry Goff
 Jonny Gomes
 Yan Gomes
 Rene Gonzales
 Alberto Gonzalez
 Alex S. González
 Gio González
 Mike Gonzalez
 Wiki González
 Brian Goodwin
 Tom Gorman
 Tom Gorzelanny
 Jim Gosger
 Trevor Gott
 Matt Grace
 Wayne Granger
 Mudcat Grant
 Rick Grapenthin
 Josiah Gray
 Grant Green
 Ross Grimsley
 Marquis Grissom
 Kevin Gross
 Mark Grudzielanek
 Kevin Gryboski
 Javy Guerra
Vladimir Guerrero
 Wilton Guerrero
 José Guillén
 Brad Gulden
 Bill Gullickson
 Jeremy Guthrie
 Cristian Guzmán
 Edwards Guzman

H

 Rich Hacker
 Don Hahn
 Jerry Hairston Jr.
 Scott Hairston
 John Halama
 Drew Hall
 Jeffrey Hammonds
 Chris Haney
 Todd Haney
 Gerry Hannahs
 Joel Hanrahan
 Dan Haren
 Brandon Harper
 Bryce Harper
 Brendan Harris
 Gene Harris
 Greg Harris
 Willie Harris
 Ron Hassey
 Heath Haynes
 Neal Heaton
 Bryan Hebson
 Chris Heisey
 Jeremy Hellickson
 Rod Henderson
 Bob Henley
 Butch Henry
 Gil Heredia
 Ubaldo Heredia
 Matt Herges
 Dustin Hermanson
 Remy Hermoso
 Anderson Hernández
 Liván Hernández
 José Herrera
 Kelvin Herrera
 Ed Herrmann
 Joe Hesketh
 Jack Hiatt
 Ken Hill
 Shawn Hill
 Mike Hinckley
 Ray Holbert
 Fred Holdsworth
 Brian Holman
 Joe Horgan
 Dave Hostetler
 Mike Hubbard
 Rex Hudler
 Daniel Hudson
 Travis Hughes
 Terry Humphrey
 Randy Hunt
 Ron Hunt
 Jonathan Hurst
 Jeff Huson
 Tommy Hutton

I

 Hideki Irabu
 César Izturis
 Maicer Izturis

J

 Damian Jackson
 Edwin Jackson
 Grant Jackson
 Bob James
 Pat Jarvis
 Larry Jaster
 Dan Jennings
 Garry Jestadt
 D'Angelo Jiménez
 Ken Johnson
 Larry Johnson
 Mike Johnson
 Nick Johnson
Randy Johnson
 Ron Johnson
 Roy Johnson
 Tony Johnson
 Wallace Johnson
 Barry Jones
 Jimmy Jones
 Mack Jones *
 Terry Jones
 Tracy Jones
 Taylor Jordan
 Mike Jorgensen
 Jeff Juden

K

 Nathan Karns
 Austin Kearns
 Joe Keener
 Shawn Kelley
 Kenny Kelly
 Roberto Kelly
 Howie Kendrick
 Adam Kennedy
 Logan Kensing
 Joe Kerrigan
 Carter Kieboom
 Spencer Kieboom
 Sun-Woo Kim
 Cole Kimball
 Ray King
 Brandon Kintzler
 Clay Kirby
 Steve Kline
 Randy Knorr
 Eric Knott
 Darold Knowles
 Jeff Kobernus
 Wayne Krenchicki
 Ian Krol
 Bill Krueger

L

 Josh Labandeira
 Coco Laboy
 Tim Laker
 Larry Landreth
 Bill Landrum
 Chip Lang
 Ryan Langerhans
 Mark Langston
 John Lannan
 Mike Lansing
 Yovanny Lara
 Adam LaRoche
 Bill Laskey
 Mat Latos
 Vance Law
 Tom Lawless
 Charlie Lea
 Matt LeCroy
 Wilfredo Ledezma
 Bill Lee
 Ron LeFlore
 Dave Leiper
 Mark Leiter
 Denny Lemaster
 Sandy León
 Randy Lerch
 Brad Lidge
 Jeff Liefer
 Ted Lilly
 Adam Lind
 Larry Lintz
 Felipe Lira
 Bryan Little
 Scott Livingstone
 Graeme Lloyd
 Esteban Loaiza
 Paul Lo Duca
 José Lobatón
 Nook Logan
 George Lombard
 Steve Lombardozzi Jr.
 Bill Long
 Brian Looney
 Felipe López
 Luis Lopez
 Reynaldo López
 Gary Lucas
 Jonathan Lucroy
 Urbano Lugo
 Rob Lukachyk
 Steve Lyons
 Jim Lyttle

M

 Mike MacDougal
 Ken Macha
 Robert Machado
 José Macías
 Pete Mackanin
 Rob Mackowiak
 Mike Maddux
 Ryan Madson
 Mickey Mahler
 Rick Mahler
 Gary Majewski
 Carlos Maldonado
 Bob Malloy
 Pepe Mangual
 Charlie Manning
 Julio Manón
 Fred Manrique
 Barry Manuel
 Jerry Manuel
 Leo Marentette
 Jason Marquis
 Chris Marrero
 Oreste Marrero
 Mike Marshall
 J. D. Martin
 Dave Martínez
 Dennis Martínez
 Manny Martínez
Pedro Martinez
 Sandy Martínez
 Shairon Martis
 Clyde Mashore
 Jim Mason
 Henry Mateo
 Luis Matos
 Troy Mattes
 Ryan Mattheus
 Justin Maxwell
 Derrick May
 Rudy May
 Yunesky Maya
 Matt Maysey
 Ernie McAnally
 Tim McCarver
 Bob McClure
 Dave McDonald
 Will McEnaney
 Andy McGaffigan
 Dan McGinn *
 Kyle McGowin
 Ryan McGuire
 Tim McIntosh
 Nate McLouth
 Dave McNally
 Sam Mejías
 Mark Melancon
 Kevin Mench
 Orlando Mercado
 Orlando Merced
 José Mercedes
 Hensley Meulens
 Lastings Milledge
 Justin Miller
 Randy Miller
 Randy Milligan
 Brad Mills
 John Milner
 Tommy Milone
 Ryan Minor
 Garrett Mock
 Dale Mohorcic
 John Montague
 Willie Montañez
 Miguel Montero
 Charlie Montoyo
 Luke Montz
 Balor Moore
 Bill Moore
 Trey Moore
 Tyler Moore
 David Moraga
 José Morales
 Mike Mordecai
 Nyjer Morgan
 Mike Morse
 Carl Morton *
 Guillermo Mota
 Manny Mota *
 James Mouton
 Arnie Muñoz
 Bobby Muñoz
 Daniel Murphy
 Patrick Murphy
 Dale Murray

N

 Chris Nabholz
 Xavier Nady
 Bob Natal
 Graig Nettles
 Al Newman
 Reid Nichols
 Steve Nicosia
 Tom Nieto
 Wil Nieves
 C. J. Nitkowski
 Laynce Nix
 Otis Nixon
 Junior Noboa
 Jake Noll
 Dan Norman
 Fred Norman
 Nelson Norman
 Jim Northrup
 Talmadge Nunnari
 Rich Nye

O

 Mike O'Berry
 Charlie O'Brien
 Jack O'Connor
 Mike O'Connor
 John O'Donoghue
 Troy O'Leary
 Tom O'Malley
 Sherman Obando
 Rowland Office
 Tomo Ohka
 Ross Ohlendorf
 Al Oliver
 Scott Olsen
 Pete Orr
 Joe Orsulak
 Ramón Ortiz
 Keith Osik
 Antonio Osuna
 Bob Owchinko
 Spike Owen

P

 Alex Pacheco
 Jorge Padilla
 David Palmer
 José Paniagua
 Stan Papi
 Johnny Paredes
 Gerardo Parra
 Jeff Parrett
 Larry Parrish
 Val Pascucci
 Bob Pate
 Corey Patterson
 John Patterson
 Carl Pavano
 Brad Peacock
 Wily Mo Peña
 Joel Peralta
 Beltrán Pérez
 Carlos Pérez
 Eury Pérez
 Odalis Pérez
 Óliver Pérez
 Pascual Pérez
 Robert Pérez
Tony Pérez
 Ryan Perry
 Chris Peters
 Yusmeiro Petit
 Marty Pevey
 Ken Phelps
 Adolfo Phillips
 Mike Phillips
 Doug Piatt
 Luis Pineda
 Gerry Pirtle
 Jim Poole
 Alonzo Powell
 Jeremy Powell
 Curtis Pride

Q

 Jim Qualls

R

 Ryan Raburn
 Dick Radatz
Tim Raines
 Tanner Rainey
 Santiago Ramírez
 Bobby Ramos
 Wilson Ramos
 Mike Ramsey
 Darrell Rasner
 Steve Ratzer
 Jon Rauch
 Claude Raymond
 Raudy Read
 Randy Ready
 Britt Reames
 Jeff Reardon
 Tim Redding
 Bob Reece
 Darren Reed
 Howie Reed
 Jeff Reed
 Anthony Rendon
 Steve Renko
 Michael Restovich
 Ben Revere
 Gilberto Reyes
 Bob Reynolds
 Mark Reynolds
 Nikco Riesgo
 Brad Rigby
 George Riley
 Bill Risley
 Bombo Rivera
 Juan Rivera
 Luis Rivera
 Saúl Rivera
 Tanner Roark
 Bert Roberge
 Jerry Robertson
 Víctor Robles
 Fernando Rodney
 Félix Rodríguez
Iván Rodríguez
 Henry Rodríguez (OF)
 Henry Rodríguez (P)
 Jefry Rodríguez
 Gary Roenicke
 Steve Rogers
 Mel Rojas
 Tom Romano
 Enny Romero
 Gene Roof
 Pat Rooney
 Jorge Roque
 Pete Rose
 Trevor Rosenthal
 Joe Ross
 Kirk Rueter
 Keibert Ruiz
 Scott Ruskin
 Marc Rzepczynski

S

 Ángel Salazar
 Bill Sampen
 Adrián Sánchez
 Aníbal Sánchez
 Scott Sanderson
 Julio Santana
 F. P. Santangelo
 Nelson Santovenia
 Rich Sauveur
 Bob Scanlan
 Pat Scanlon
 Dan Schatzeder
 Fred Scherman
 Max Scherzer
 Curt Schmidt
 Dave Schmidt
 Brian Schneider
 Chris Schroder
 Rick Schu
 Kyle Schwarber
 Mickey Scott
 Rodney Scott
 Tim Scott
 Tony Scott
 Bob Sebra
 Zack Segovia
 David Segui
 Fernando Seguignol
 Carroll Sembera
 Scott Service
 Atahualpa Severino
 Pedro Severino
 Don Shaw *
 Jeff Shaw
 Steve Shea
 Steven Shell
 Razor Shines
 Rick Short
 Joe Siddall
 Dave Silvestri
 Doug Simons
 Jason Simontacchi
 Ken Singleton
 Tony Sipp
 Matt Skrmetta
 Doug Slaten
 Terrmel Sledge
 J. D. Smart
 Bryn Smith
 Chris Smith
 Dan Smith
 Lee Smith
 Mark Smith
 Mike Smith
 Zane Smith
 Chris Snelling
 Tony Solaita
 Jhonatan Solano
 Lary Sorensen
 Alfonso Soriano
 Rafael Soriano
 Elías Sosa
 Jorge Sosa
 Juan Soto
 Denard Span
 Joe Sparma
 Tim Spehr
 Chris Speier
 Levale Speigner
 Sean Spencer
 Junior Spivey
 Randy St. Claire
 Marv Staehle
 Matt Stairs
 Craig Stammen
 Don Stanhouse
 Andy Stankiewicz
 Mike Stanton
 Rusty Staub
 John Stefero
 Mike Stenhouse
 Lee Stevens
 Andrew Stevenson
 Scott Stewart
 Bob Stinson
 Bill Stoneman
 Drew Storen
 Da Rond Stovall
 Chris Stowers
 Doug Strange
 Stephen Strasburg
 Hunter Strickland
 Scott Strickland
 John Strohmayer
 Everett Stull
 Wander Suero
 Gary Sutherland
 Kurt Suzuki
 Stan Swanson
 Ron Swoboda

T

 John Tamargo
 Tony Tarasco
 Fernando Tatís
 Julián Tavárez
 Frank Taveras
 Willy Taveras
 Chuck Taylor
 Michael A. Taylor
 Wilfredo Tejada
 Anthony Telford
 Jeff Terpko
 J. J. Thobe
 Derrel Thomas
 Jason Thompson
 Mason Thompson
 Rich Thompson
 Scot Thompson
 Andre Thornton
 Mike Thurman
 Jay Tibbs
 Dave Tomlin
 Carlos Torres
 Héctor Torres
 Salomón Torres
 Mike Torrez
 Billy Traber
 Andy Tracy
 Chad Tracy
 Jeff Treadway
 Manny Trillo
 Chris Truby
 T. J. Tucker
 Jacob Turner
 Trea Turner
 Wayne Twitchell

U

 Del Unser
 Ugueth Urbina

V

 Mike Vail
 Marc Valdes
 Sergio Valdéz
 Ellis Valentine
 Yohanny Valera
 John Vander Wal
 Claudio Vargas
 Javier Vázquez
 Max Venable
 Jonny Venters
 Mike Vento
 Dave Veres
 José Vidro
 Ron Villone
 Joe Vitiello
 Ed Vosberg
 Austin Voth

W

 Ryan Wagner
 David Wainhouse
 Larry Walker
 Tom Walker
 Tyler Walker
 Tim Wallach
 Zach Walters
 Bruce Walton
 Chien-Ming Wang
 Daryle Ward
 Dan Warthen
 U L Washington
 Gary Waslewski
 Brandon Watson
 Lenny Webster
 Mitch Webster
 Mike Wegener
 Kip Wells
 Chris Welsh
 Jayson Werth
 John Wetteland
 Derrick White
 Gabe White
 Jerry White
 Matt White
 Rondell White
 Fred Whitfield
 Floyd Wicker
 Chris Widger
 Tom Wieghaus
 Brad Wilkerson
 Jerry Willard
 Austen Williams
 Earl Williams
 Jerome Williams
 Kenny Williams
 Josh Willingham
 Maury Wills
 Josh Wilson
 Nick Wilson
 Preston Wilson
 Bobby Wine
 Herm Winningham
 Jim Wohlford
 Ted Wood
 Ron Woods
 George Wright

X

Y

 Masato Yoshii
 Ned Yost
 Floyd Youmans
 Dmitri Young
 Pete Young
 Tim Young
 Joel Youngblood

Z

 Todd Zeile
 Ryan Zimmerman
 Jordan Zimmermann

External links
 Major League Baseball
 Baseball Reference

Roster
Major League Baseball all-time rosters
Montreal Expos